The October 2015 Aden missile attack occurred on 6 October 2015, when a group of attackers targeted the Al-Qasr hotel which housed the Vice President and Prime Minister of Yemen; and served as a de facto military base for the Arab Coalition and the Yemen Army units loyal to President Abd Rabbuh Mansur Hadi. Although the Houthis were first suspected by Yemeni Transport Minister Badr Basalma of being behind the attack, the Islamic State of Iraq and the Levant claimed responsibility for the attack.

References

2015 murders in Yemen
Attacks on hotels in Asia
Mass murder in 2015
Terrorist incidents in Aden
Terrorist incidents in Yemen in 2015
October 2015 events in Yemen
21st century in Aden
2015 in Aden